Sherri Lynn Stoner is an American actress, animator, and writer. She also voiced Slappy in the children’s television series Animaniacs.

Biography
She has worked extensively in animation. She was a writer and producer for such 1990s animated shows as Tiny Toon Adventures and Animaniacs. She is probably best known for Animaniacs, for which she created and voiced Slappy Squirrel, a grumpy retired cartoon squirrel. In 2023 she reprised the role of Slappy Squirrel for the final episode of the Animaniacs revival.  She lives and works in Los Angeles. 

She co-wrote (with Deanna Oliver) Universal's Casper and was on the writing staff of the 1996 revival of an animated Casper the Friendly Ghost, also known as The Spooktacular New Adventures of Casper. Stoner and Oliver wrote the Disney film, My Favorite Martian, based on the original 1960s TV series.

Stoner served as animation reference model for Ariel in Disney's The Little Mermaid and for Belle in Beauty and the Beast. Ariel frequently bites her lower lip, and this was a mannerism of Stoner's that was adapted by animators. 

Stoner's live-action television work includes a recurring role as Rachel Brown Oleson in the 9th season of Little House on the Prairie, and appearances in Murder, She Wrote and Knots Landing. She worked with Tom Ruegger as story editor on Disney's The 7D.

On the big screen, Stoner starred alongside Wendy O. Williams in the 1986 cult film favorite Reform School Girls. She was also a member of The Groundlings improvisational troupe in Los Angeles.

References

External links
 

Year of birth missing (living people)
Living people
Actresses from Santa Monica, California
American women television writers
American television writers
American women screenwriters
Screenwriters from California
American voice actresses
Writers from Santa Monica, California
21st-century American women